Guido Trentin (born November 24, 1975, in Grandate) is a former Italian professional road bicycle racer. His greatest achievement was winning stage 5 of the 2002 Vuelta a España.

Career
Trentin turned professional in 1999 with the Italian  team and won the Tour Trans Canada stage race in his first year as a professional. In 2000 Trentin, riding his first Tour de France, came second in the young rider classification, behind Francisco Mancebo. Trentin moved onto the Cofidis team in 2001, and spent five years with the French squad. Trentin recorded three wins beyond his stage victory in the 2002 Vuelta a España: overall victory in the 2003 Tour du Poitou Charentes et de la Vienne and stage wins in the 2005 Tour de Wallonie and 2005 Troféu Joaquim Agostinho.

After the 2007 season, Trentin left the Saunier team and stopped his professional career as cyclist.

Major results
Trentin won 3 stages in his career, and three general classifications:

 Tour de Wallonie – 1 stage (2005)
 Trofeú Joaquim Agostinho – 1 stage (2005)
 Tour du Poitou-Charentes – Overall (2002)
 Vuelta a España – 1 stage (2002)
 Trans Canada – Overall (1999)
 Triptyque Ardennais – Overall (1997)

Notes and references

External links
Profile at the Saunier Duval-Prodir official website

Italian male cyclists
1975 births
Living people
Cyclists from the Province of Como
Italian Vuelta a España stage winners